Permodalan Nasional Berhad (PNB) is one of the largest fund management companies in Malaysia. It was established on 17 March 1978 as one of the instruments of the government's New Economic Policy.

PNB's two notable projects is located in Kuala Lumpur. It is the Merdeka 118 on Jalan Hang Jebat and PNB 1194 Hotel (formerly MAS Building) on Jalan Sultan Ismail.

Headquarters

Permodalan Nasional Berhad (PNB) Headquarters in Kuala Lumpur, at PNB Tower.

People

List of Chairpersons  
 Ismail Mohd Ali (1978 – 1996)
 Ahmad Sarji Abdul Hamid (1996 – 2016)
 Abdul Wahid Omar (2016 – 2018)
 Zeti Akhtar Aziz (2018 – 2021)
 Arifin Zakaria (2021 – Incumbent)

List of Chief Executive Officers (CEOs) 
 Desa Pachi (1978 – 1979)
 Khalid Ibrahim (1979 – 1994)
 Hilmey Taib (1995 – 1997)
 Hamad Kama Piah Che Othman (1998 – 2016)
 Abdul Rahman Ahmad (2016 – 2019)
 Abdul Jalil Abdul Rasheed (2019 – 2020)
 Ahmad Zulqarnain Onn (2020 – Incumbent)

PNB Groups companies
 Amanah Saham Nasional Berhad (ASNB)
 Pelaburan Hartanah Nasional Berhad (PHNB)
 Property Management Services Sdn Bhd (PMSSB)
 PNB Commercial Sdn Berhad (PNBC)
 PNB Development Sdn Bhd (PNBD)
 PNB Merdeka Ventures Sdn Bhd (PNBMV)
 PNB Research Institute Sdn Bhd (PNBRi)

References

External links
 Permodalan Nasional Berhad (PNB)
 Amanah Saham Nasional Berhad (ASNB)

1978 establishments in Malaysia
 
Economy of Malaysia
Government-owned companies of Malaysia
Privately held companies of Malaysia
Companies based in Kuala Lumpur